"Where I Belong" is the debut single from Irish boyband HomeTown. The song was released in Ireland as a digital download on 28 November 2014 through Sony Music Entertainment. It was released as the lead single from their self-titled debut studio album. The song has peaked at number 1 on the Irish Singles Chart. An acoustic version was released on 29 August 2015, and a remix on 30 August 2015.

Reception
Sophie Bird from Flavour Mag said "Where I Belong" is a fast catchy song that everyone will love! It’s one of these songs where you’ll learn the lyrics just by listening to it once."

Music video
A music video to accompany the release of "Where I Belong" was first released onto YouTube on 17 July 2015 at a total length of three minutes and fifty-four seconds.

Track listing

Chart performance

Weekly charts

Release history

References

Irish Singles Chart number-one singles
2014 songs
2014 debut singles
Pop ballads